The 12th AARP Movies for Grownups Awards, presented by AARP the Magazine, honored films released in 2012 and were announced on February 4, 2013. Susan Sarandon was the winner of the annual Career Achievement Award, and Dustin Hoffman won the award for Breakthrough Achievement for his first directorial effort, Quartet.

Awards

Winners and Nominees

Winners are listed first, highlighted in boldface, and indicated with a double dagger.

Career Achievement Award
 Susan Sarandon

Breakthrough Accomplishment
 Dustin Hoffman: "Hoffman doesn't just cut his cast loose [in Quartet, his directorial debut]; he guides them through a minefield of possible missteps to create a film bursting with sentiment, yet stubbornly dry-eyed."

Films with multiple nominations and awards

References

AARP Movies for Grownups Awards
AARP